Oregon Mozart Players is a professional chamber orchestra based in Eugene, Oregon, United States. The orchestra presents five concert sets in a typical season, in addition to numerous small ensemble performances and recitals by guest artists. Orchestral repertoire ranges from the Baroque period to world premieres of 21st century works. Soloists with the group include internationally acclaimed artists as well as members of the orchestra. The current conductor and artistic director is Kelly Kuo.

History
The organization was founded in 1983 in Eugene by a group of professional musicians, many from the University of Oregon, who wanted to play the wealth of music written for small orchestras and intimate venues and who recognized that they could do so and could bring this music to the Eugene-Springfield community by forming their own orchestra. Today, many of OMP's performances take place at Beall Concert Hall at the University of Oregon.

At first, the organization functioned as a sort of musicians' cooperative, but after a few years it established a non-profit organization with a board of directors and modest staff. In keeping with the group's roots, the corporation bylaws specify that as many as six musicians, elected by the players, may sit on the board of directors, and the board's vice president must be a player.

The orchestra's conductors and music directors have included Robert Hurwitz, Apo Hsu, Andrew Massey and Glen Cortese. A number of other distinguished musicians have served as guest conductors.

The Mozart Players encourage an appreciation of classical music among young people, as both listeners and performers. OMP musicians, including the conductor and guest artists, are also available to visit schools, meet with students, and share their enthusiasm for the music performed in concerts.

External links
 Official website
 Hult Center for the Performing Arts web site

Recent concert reviews
Reviews from the 2019-2020 Season
Reviews from the 2018-2019 Season
Reviews from the 2017-2018 Season

Musical groups from Eugene, Oregon
Mozart music ensembles
1983 establishments in Oregon
Musical groups established in 1983
Orchestras based in Oregon